Bowles is an English and Irish surname of Norman origin. Notable people with the surname include:

Andrew Parker Bowles (born 1939), British military officer
Benjamin F. Bowles (1869–1928), African American civil rights leader, high school principal, and founder and president of Douglass University
Brian Bowles (baseball) (born 1976), US baseball player
Brian Bowles (fighter) (born 1980), US mixed martial artist 
Camilla Parker Bowles (born 1947), former name of the Duchess of Cornwall, wife of Prince Charles
Charles J. Bowles (1922–2005), US athletics coach
Chester Bowles (1901–1986), US diplomat and politician
Cory Bowles (born 1973), Canadian actor
Cyril Bowles (1916–1999), English bishop
Denzel Bowles (born 1989), American basketball player
Edward Augustus Bowles (1865–1954), British horticulturalist and writer
Erskine Bowles (born 1945), US businessman and politician
Evelyn M. Bowles (1921–2016) US politician
Frank Bowles, Baron Bowles (1902–1970), British solicitor and politician
Gary Ray Bowles (1962–2019), American serial killer
Hamish Bowles (born 1963), British magazine editor
Ian Bowles (born circa 1966), environmentalist, businessman, politician, and former Massachusetts Secretary of Energy and Environmental Affairs
Jack Bowles (1890–1971), English cricketer
Jane Bowles (1917–1973), US writer
Janet Payne Bowles (1872–1948), US artist
Jesse G. Bowles (1921–2007), Justice of the Supreme Court of Georgia
John Bowles (author) (1751–1819), English lawyer and author
Jovan Bowles (born 1983), South African rugby player
Lynn Bowles (born 1963), British radio reporter
Martin Bowles, senior Australian public servant
Michael Bowles (1909–1998), Irish conductor and composer
Oliver Bowles (died c. 1646), English Presbyterian minister and divine
Paul Bowles (1910–1999), US composer, author, and translator
Paul Bowles (footballer) (1957–2017), English football player
Peter Bowles (1936–2022), English actor
Pinckney Downie Bowles (1835–1910), US lawyer and soldier
Ralston Bowles (born 1952), US musician
Ray Bowles (born 1975), US singer
Richard Bowles (born 1978), English-born Australian long-distance runner
Richard Spink Bowles (1912–1988), Canadian lawyer
Samuel Bowles (economist) (born 1939), US economist
Samuel Bowles (journalist) (1826–1878), US journalist
Sharon Bowles (born 1953), British politician
Skipper Bowles (1919–1986), US politician
Stan Bowles (born 1948), English football player
Sydney (Bowles) Mitford (1880–1963), matriarch of the Mitford family
Todd Bowles (born 1963), American football coach
Tom Parker Bowles (born 1974), British writer
Wayde Douglas Bowles (AKA Rocky Johnson) (1944–2020), Canadian wrestler, father of Dwayne Johnson

Fictional characters:
"Sally Bowles", a short story in the 1939 novel Goodbye to Berlin by Christopher Isherwood
Sally Bowles, fictional character in the 1966 stage musical Cabaret, based on the novel
Sally Bowles, fictional character in the 1972 film Cabaret, based on the musical
Snowy Bowles, fictional character in the television series Sweat, played by Heath Ledger

See also
Thomas Bowles (disambiguation)
William Bowles (disambiguation)
Bols (surname)

English-language surnames
Surnames of Irish origin
Lists of people by surname
Surnames of Norman origin